Picabo Street (born 1971) is an American World Cup alpine ski racer and Olympic gold medalist.

Picabo may also refer to:

 Picabo, Idaho, U.S.
 Picabo volcanic field, in Yellowstone volcanic hotspot, western U.S.
 Picabo, a character on the Canadian children's television show Les Oraliens

See also
 Peekaboo (disambiguation)
 Picaboo, a self-publishing and printing service based in Hanover, New Hampshire, U.S.
 Picabu, restaurant at the Walt Disney World Dolphin resort